Oley Creek is a tributary of Nescopeck Creek in Luzerne County, Pennsylvania, in the United States. It flows through Foster Township, Dennison Township, and Butler Township. Long Hollow is a tributary of the creek. It is a high-quality coldwater fishery in its upper reaches and a Class A Wild Trout Fishery for part of its distance. The creek is in the upper reaches of the Nescopeck Creek watershed. It is named after a community in Berks County, Pennsylvania known as Oley.

Course
Oley Creek begins in Foster Township, on the northern side of Green Mountain. It flows north for some distance before crossing Interstate 80 and receiving the tributary Long Hollow. Here, the creek turns west, exiting Foster Township and entering Dennison Township. It continues flowing parallel to Interstate 80 in this township, as well as flowing near the southern edge of Mount Yeager. After a short distance, it turns southwest, away from Interstate 80 and Mount Yeager. The creek passes by a strip mine and turns west, exiting Dennison Township. Upon exiting Dennison Township, the creek enters Butler Township, where it enters a lake. On the other side of the lake, the creek flows for a short distance before reaching its confluence with Nescopeck Creek.

Tributaries
Oley Creek has one named tributary: Long Hollow. It is in the creek's upper reaches and mostly flows west. Its source is on Mount Yeager.

Hydrology
The pH of Oley Creek is 6.4 and the concentration of alkalinity is 6 milligrams per liter. The hardness of the creek's water is 7 milligrams per liter. The specific conductance is 63 μmhos.

Oley Creek is somewhat affected by acid mine drainage. It has also experienced acid rain.

Annually,  of erosion flows through Oley Creek, as does  of sediment. The creek's nitrogen and phosphorus accounts for 1.7 percent and 3 percent of Nescopeck Creek's nitrogen and phosphorus, respectively.

Watershed, geography, and geology
The watershed of Oley Creek is located in the upper part of the Nescopeck Creek watershed. It has an area of 7.2 square miles.

Significantly more than 80 percent of the watershed's area is forest. Within  of the creek, approximately 80 percent of the land is forested, while less than 10 percent is agricultural land and less than 3 percent is barren.

Beech Mountain Lake is near part of Oley Creek. There is a pond with a surface area of  that is located at the headwaters of an unnamed tributary of the creek.

A valley known as the Oley Valley is located on Oley Creek.

All of the Class A Wild Trout Waters on Oley Creek are public and open.

History and etymology
Oley Creek's name comes from the historic community of Oley, in Berks County, which in turn may derive from the Delaware words olink, wólink, olo, or wahlo, which mean "a cavern cell, a sinkhole, a dug hole to bury anything in, as also a tract of land encompassed by high hills".

Historically, Oley Creek was on the western edge of the territory of the Munsee people.

In the past, there were coal mines on Oley Creek near Green Mountain. In the early 1970s, a tributary of the creek was dammed to produce the Lake of the Four Seasons, also known as Beech Mountain Lake. In 2000, the Eastern Pennsylvania Marine Properties Company purchased  on the lake.

The Oley Creek Watershed Association was established on September 4, 2003.

Biology
Although Oley Creek is considered to be an infertile stream, it is also designated as a Class A Wild Brook Trout fishery for a  stretch from the mouth of Long Hollow downstream to Interstate 80. The upper reaches of the watershed are designated as a high-quality coldwater fishery.

See also
Long Run (Nescopeck Creek), next tributary of Nescopeck Creek going downstream
Little Nescopeck Creek A, next tributary of Nescopeck Creek going upstream
List of rivers of Pennsylvania

References 

Rivers of Luzerne County, Pennsylvania
Rivers of Pennsylvania
Tributaries of Nescopeck Creek